The Cooper T45 was an open-wheel formula racing car, developed and built by the Cooper Car Company in 1958, and designed by Owen Maddock. It competed in Formula 2 racing as well as in Formula One racing, where it won one World Championship Grand Prix, the 1958 Monaco Grand Prix, being driven by Maurice Trintignant.

Development history and technology
The Cooper T45 was the successor to the Cooper T43. The chassis remained almost unchanged, but the wheel suspension was revised. The engine was lowered. Until 1959 the cars had drum brakes, which were then replaced by disc brakes.

Racing history
For the Formula 1 version, Climax developed a 2.2-litre engine. Since this engine was exclusively available to the works team, Rob Walker had to resort to the 2-litre engine, which had less power. In 1958, Frenchman Maurice Trintignant surprisingly won the Monaco Grand Prix with the Walker 2-litre T45. However, the car lacked power on the fast stretches. Especially against the competition from Ferrari and Vanwall, the Coopers had no chance. Works driver Roy Salvadori was third at Silverstone and second at the Nurburgring and fourth overall in the Drivers' Championship. Cooper finished third in the Constructor's Championship, which was held for the first time.

Complete Formula One World Championship results
(key) (results in bold indicate pole position, results in italics indicate fastest lap)

 Formula Two entry.    Points also scored by the Cooper T43.   All points scored by other Cooper models.   Points also scored by other Cooper models.

References 

Cooper Formula One cars
Formula Two cars
1958 Formula One season cars
1959 Formula One season cars
1960 Formula One season cars
1961 Formula One season cars